David Kuiper (born 12 December 1980 in Aduard) is a rower from the Netherlands.

Kuiper took part in the World Championships of 2007 in Munich becoming tenth in the eights. He qualified for the 2008 Summer Olympics in Beijing with the Dutch eights forming a team with Olaf van Andel, Jozef Klaassen, Meindert Klem, Rogier Blink, Diederik Simon, Olivier Siegelaar, Mitchel Steenman and cox Peter Wiersum. Due to an injury Siegelaar was replaced by Reinder Lubbers during the tournament.

References

1980 births
Living people
Dutch male rowers
Rowers at the 2008 Summer Olympics
Olympic rowers of the Netherlands
People from Zuidhorn
Sportspeople from Groningen (province)